Hal Lewis may refer to:
 Harold Lewis (1923–2011), physicist
 Hal Lewis (Aku) (died 1983), radio personality
 Hal Lewis (American football, born 1935), American football player for the Indianapolis Colts, Buffalo Bills and Oakland Raiders
 Hal Lewis (American football, born 1944), American football player for the Denver Broncos, see List of American Football League players

See also
Harry Lewis (disambiguation)
Henry Lewis (disambiguation)
Harold Lewis (disambiguation)